Hussain Zarrini (born 19 June 1930) is an Iranian weightlifter. He competed in the men's featherweight event at the 1956 Summer Olympics.

References

External links

1930 births
Possibly living people
Iranian male weightlifters
Olympic weightlifters of Iran
Weightlifters at the 1956 Summer Olympics
Place of birth missing (living people)
20th-century Iranian people